Long Point is an unincorporated community in Tama County, in the U.S. state of Iowa.

History
A post office was established at Long Point in 1890, and remained in operation until it was discontinued in 1920. The community was named from a long point on the nearby Iowa River. Long Point's population was 33 in 1902.

References

Unincorporated communities in Tama County, Iowa
Unincorporated communities in Iowa